Maria is a fictional character in the play Twelfth Night by William Shakespeare. She is a servant in Olivia's household. Maria is shown to have a friendly relationship with Sir Toby Belch, and exhibits a witty attitude. Maria also forges a love letter to Malvolio which results in Malvolio being confined to a dark room (a treatment for madness).

Connections with other characters
 Maria is Olivia's personal house-maid
 Sir Toby Belch is Olivia's uncle
 Malvolio is the steward in Olivia's household and therefore Maria's superior

Performers

References
Guide to Twelfth Night
Analysis of Major Characters in Twelfth Night
Summary of Twelfth Night and Characters

Characters in Twelfth Night
Female Shakespearean characters